Savkuz Dzaboyevich Dzarasov (5 January 1930 – 12 July 1990) was a Russian heavyweight freestyle wrestler who won bronze medals at the 1959 World Championships and 1960 Olympics. Domestically he won the Soviet title in 1958 and 1959, placing second in 1952 and 1961 and third in 1960.

In 1950 Dzarasov graduated from the North Ossetian State University, and in his late years worked as a sports official. He was of ethnic Ossetian descent.

References

External links

1930 births
1990 deaths
Soviet male sport wrestlers
Olympic wrestlers of the Soviet Union
Wrestlers at the 1960 Summer Olympics
Russian male sport wrestlers
Olympic bronze medalists for the Soviet Union
Olympic medalists in wrestling
Medalists at the 1960 Summer Olympics
North Ossetian State University alumni